Stephen Cafiero was a male French international table tennis player.

He won bronze medal at the 1955 World Table Tennis Championships in the men's singles.

He was a three times French National doubles champion in 1954 and 1955 with Jean-Claude Sala and in 1960 with Jacques Gambier.

See also
 List of table tennis players
 List of World Table Tennis Championships medalists

References

French male table tennis players
World Table Tennis Championships medalists